Clabber Peak is a mountain located in the Catskill Mountains of New York state, southeast of Barbourville. Speedwell Mountain is located southwest of Clabber Peak, and Tower Mountain is located east-northeast of it.

References

Mountains of Delaware County, New York
Mountains of New York (state)